There is a large community of Vietnamese people in Laos. As Vietnam and Laos are neighbours, there is a long history of population migrations between the territories which today make up the two respective countries.

Migration history
When Laos was a French protectorate, the French colonial administration brought many Vietnamese people to Laos to work as civil servants. This matter was the object of strenuous opposition by Phetsarath Ratanavongsa, who in the 1930s made an unsuccessful attempt to replace Vietnamese in the government with Lao people. After Vietnamese emperor Bảo Đại's declaration of Vietnamese independence in 1945, Vietnamese people all over Laos held demonstrations; in particular, members of Savannakhet's Vietnamese youth association staged a march through the town waving a Japanese imperial Rising Sun Flag and a Vietnamese flag. Despite their common interest with the Lao people in preserving their independence from France, some had irredentist aspirations to detach parts of southern Laos and integrate them into the Vietnamese state, which led Phetsarath to develop further suspicion of them.

Recent estimates for the size of the Vietnamese community in Laos vary. A 2008 report by Việt Báo newspaper stated that there were 20,000. A 2012 report by Voice of Vietnam stated 30,000. Ethnologue''' states that there are 79,000 Vietnamese speakers in Laos.

Community organisations
In the Laotian capital of Vientiane, the Nguyen Du Kindergarten and Elementary School enrolls 2,000 students of both Vietnamese and Lao origin, providing them with an education using Vietnamese as the medium of instruction. Another organisation is the Association of Vietnamese People in Laos (Tổng hội người Việt Nam tại Lào)'', which has organised various activities such as football games between Vietnamese and Lao people, as well as collecting donations for charitable activities.

Notes

References

Further reading

Ethnic groups in Laos
Laos–Vietnam relations
Laos
Laos